Armi Anja Orvokki Aavikko (1 September 1958, Helsinki – 2 January 2002, Espoo) was a Finnish beauty queen and singer. She was chosen as Miss Finland in 1977 and was best known for her duets with singer Danny.

Toward the end of her life, Aavikko struggled with alcoholism and depression.

She died on 2 January 2002 from pneumonia at the age of 43. She was buried in the Malmi Cemetery. Aavikko achieved some posthumous camp notoriety in 2006 when the Armi & Danny video "I Wanna Love You Tender," featuring Armi as Sandy Olsson from Grease and surrounded by backing dancers in Rydell High cheerleader uniforms with incomprehensible choreography, became an Internet phenomenon.

Discography 
 Danny & Armi (with Danny) (1978)
 Toinen LP (with Danny) (1979)
 Armi (1981)
 Armi ja lemmikit (1993)
 Armi Aavikko (2002)

References

External links
 

1958 births
2002 deaths
20th-century Finnish women singers
Alcohol-related deaths in Finland
Deaths from pneumonia in Finland
Miss Finland winners
Miss Universe 1977 contestants
Singers from Helsinki